Enthroned Madonna and Child with Saint James the Great and Saint Jerome is a c.1517 oil on canvas painting by Moretto da Brescia, now in the High Museum of Art in Atlanta, which acquired it in 1950. It is one of the painter's earliest known works.

It is first recorded in 1824 and 1837  catalogues of the collection of count Teodoro Lechi of Brescia - he acquired it sometime after 1814, since it does not appear in another catalogue of his collection made that year. It was sold in London in 1845 and later appeared in the Cook collection in Richmond-upon-Thames

References

Paintings of the Madonna and Child by Moretto da Brescia
1517 paintings
Paintings in Georgia (U.S. state)
Paintings of Jerome
Paintings of James the Great